Nanamori may refer to:

People 
 Mie Nanamori (七森 美江, born 1972), Japanese actress
 Nanamori (singer) (ななもり。), Japanese singer
 Nana Mori (森 七菜, born 2001), Japanese actress

Characters 
 Sayoko Nanamori, a RahXephon character